The Hempstead Branch is an electrified rail line and service owned and operated by the Long Island Rail Road in the U.S. state of New York. The branch begins at the Main Line at  Queens Interlocking, just east of Queens Village station. It parallels the Main Line past Bellerose to Floral Park, where it splits southward and continues east via the village of Garden City to Hempstead Crossing. There it turns south to the final two stations, Country Life Press and Hempstead.

LIRR maps and schedules show Hempstead Branch service continuing west along the Main Line to Jamaica. The Hempstead Branch's trains stop at Hollis and Queens Village stations on the Main Line, but these two stations are not served by any other Main Line trains. The line is double tracked to just east of Garden City Station, where it is reduced to one track at Garden Interlocking for the final  to Hempstead station.

History 

The original Hempstead Branch of the LIRR ran south from Mineola, ending just west of the current terminal in Hempstead. It opened on July 4, 1839, as the first branch of the LIRR.

The Central Railroad of Long Island opened from Flushing east to Hempstead Crossing and south to Hempstead on January 8, 1873; the main line east from Hempstead Crossing opened later that year on May 26. CRRLI extended their line east to Bethpage, Farmingdale, and Babylon resulting in the creation of their own Hempstead Branch running parallel to the one owed by the LIRR. The Central Railroad's successor, the Flushing, North Shore and Central Railroad, was leased to the LIRR on May 3, 1876, and in June a connection at Hempstead Crossing was built, allowing trains from Mineola to use the ex-Central's Hempstead Branch; the original LIRR Hempstead Branch was abandoned south of Hempstead Crossing.

The old Central main line through Hempstead was named the Central Branch by the LIRR, while the line from Mineola on the LIRR's Main Line south past Hempstead Crossing to Hempstead was the Hempstead Branch. The New York Bay Extension Railroad opened the current West Hempstead Branch in 1893, resulting in a realignment of the Hempstead Branch from Hempstead Crossing south to Meadow Street to better connect to the new line.

Electric service on the current route of the Hempstead Branch, from Queens Village east along the Main Line and Central Branch and south along the Hempstead Branch to Hempstead, was inaugurated on May 26, 1908. In 1910, the branch's connection to the Main Line was double-tracked. The then-Hempstead Branch north to Mineola was electrified on October 20, 1926, along with the West Hempstead Branch.

The line north of Hempstead Crossing last saw passenger service on September 14, 1935, and was abandoned for freight in 1965. Park Interlocking at Floral Park was eliminated in the circa-1960 grade crossing elimination; Hempstead Branch trains switch off the Main Line at Queens Interlocking, just east of Elmont–UBS Arena station, and continue next to it to Floral Park.

Projects

Stations 

References

External links 

 Hempstead Branch Stations (Unofficial LIRR History web site)
 NYCSubway.org: Hempstead Branch
 Hempstead Branch (The LIRR Today)

Long Island Rail Road branches
Transportation in Nassau County, New York
Hempstead (village), New York
1873 establishments in New York (state)